Sintoria cyanea is a species of robber flies, insects in the family Asilidae, in the order Diptera ("flies").

References

Further reading

External links

Asilidae